The 2017 Missouri Valley Conference Women's Soccer Tournament was the postseason women's soccer tournament for the Missouri Valley Conference held from October 29 through November 5, 2017. The opening round matches of the tournament were held at campus sites, while the semifinals and final took place at Betty and Bobby Allison South Stadium in Springfield, Missouri. The six-team single-elimination tournament consisted of three rounds based on seeding from regular season conference play. The defending champions were the Illinois State Redbirds, but they were eliminated from the 2017 tournament with a 1–0 loss to the Northern Iowa Panthers in the opening round. The Missouri State Lady Bears won the tournament with a 1–0 win over Northern Iowa in the final. The conference tournament title was the second for the Missouri State women's soccer program, both of which have come under the direction of head coach Rob Brewer.

Bracket

Schedule

Opening Round

Semifinals

Final

Statistics

Goalscorers 

2 Goals
 Jenna Szczesny - Loyola Chicago
 Brynell Yount - Northern Iowa

1 Goal
 Jordan Eickelman - Missouri State
 Cory Griffith - Valparaiso
 Brooke Prondzinski - Missouri State
 Kelsey Yarrow - Northern Iowa

See also 
 2017 Missouri Valley Conference Men's Soccer Tournament

References 

Missouri Valley Conference Women's Soccer Tournament
2017 Missouri Valley Conference women's soccer season